Wojtaszek is a surname of Polish origin. See also:

Anna Wojtaszek, Poland-born Australian retired athlete
Damian Wojtaszek (born 1988), Polish volleyball player
Emil Wojtaszek (1927–2017), Polish politician
Ewa Wojtaszek (born 1959), Polish sprint canoer
Radosław Wojtaszek (born 1987), Polish chess Grandmaster